Amy Cheung may refer to:

 Amy Cheung (writer), Hong Kong writer
 Amy Cheung (artist), Hong Kong artist